John Bowe  (born 16 April 1954 in Devonport, Tasmania) is an Australian racing driver, presently racing a Holden Torana in the Touring Car Masters series.

Bowe is a multiple Australian Champion, having twice won the Australian Drivers' Championship during the Formula Mondial era and the Australian Sports Car Championship, before winning the Australian Touring Car Championship in 1995. He has also won the prestigious Bathurst 1000 touring car endurance race twice, in 1989 and 1994. Both wins were as co-driver with longtime friend and teammate Dick Johnson driving for iconic Ford team Dick Johnson Racing.

Racing Cars
Bowe began racing at the age of sixteen in Formula Vee Elfin 500 in 1971, winning the Tasmanian state title on debut. The following year, he also won the Tasmanian Formula Ford title.

After graduating from domestic Formula Ford racing Bowe moved into the Australian Drivers Championship in the late 1970s, racing Elfin Formula 5000s for the most prestigious team of the era, the factory Ansett Team Elfin run by Elfin Sports Cars founder and chief designer Garrie Cooper. The pinnacle of his Formula 5000 career was finishing runner up in the 1979 Australian Grand Prix driving one of Cooper's Chevrolet V8 powered Elfin MR8s. In the same year he also came second in the Australian Formula 2 Championship.

Bowe would finish third in the 1980 Australian Drivers' Championship driving the MR8, and would finish fourth in the Formula 2 title. He would finish fourth in 1981 driving the Elfin MR9, the only Ground effects F5000 ever built. He also dropped to ninth place in the Formula 2 championship driving an Elfin Two-25 Volkswagen.

After playing second fiddle to Alfredo Costanzo for several seasons, Bowe broke through for his first Australian Drivers' Championship in 1984, backing it up the following year with his second title in his Ford powered Ralt RT4 for Chris Leach. The 1984 and 1985 championships were run under Formula Mondial regulations.

Bowe qualified on the front row for the 1984 Australian Grand Prix at Calder Park in Melbourne and led the race for the first 18 laps before a loose spark plug lead caused the 4 cyl Ford engine to misfire and he was passed by defending race winner Roberto Moreno of Brazil who went on to win the race. Bowe finally stopped on lap 33 and rejoined in 13th place. He would fight his way back to 6th place by the end of the race (2 laps down), setting the 3rd fastest race lap behind Moreno's Ralt and the similar car of Formula One driver Andrea de Cesaris.

Bowe's last open wheeler race was in the Formula Mondial support race at the 1986 Australian Grand Prix in Adelaide. Driving a Ralt RT4 in the race (for the first time in 12 months), Bowe equalled the category lap record for the Adelaide Street Circuit set one year earlier by American driver Ross Cheever, the younger brother of Formula One driver Eddie Cheever. Bowe's time of 1:33.20 for the 3.780 km (2.362 mi) track compared to the fastest Formula One race lap of the circuit that year of 1:20.78 set by Nelson Piquet driving a  turbocharged Williams-Honda.

Bowe was appointed a Member of the Order of Australia for "significant service to motorsport as a touring car driver" in the 2021 Queen's Birthday Honours.

Sports Cars
John Bowe drove the Bryan Thompson–owned Mercedes-Benz 450 SLC-Chevrolet twin-turbo in Sports Sedan and GT events during the early 1980s when Thompson was in retirement, which stopped when Thompson came out of retirement in 1983. The Mercedes with its 4.2-litre Chevrolet engine put out a reported , but was somewhat unreliable due to the use of smaller turbo's.

In 1985 while still contesting the Australian drivers' Championship, Bowe was approached by Adelaide-based photographer and Sports Car racer Bernie Van Elsen to race his new car for the Australian Sports Car Championship (ASCC). The car, built by K&A Engineering in Adelaide and called a Veskanda C1, was initially powered by an F5000 sourced 5.0-litre Chevrolet V8, though this was changed to a 5.8-litre (350 cui) Chevrolet V8 in 1986 when CAMS increased the engine capacity limit for Group A Sports Cars from 5000 cc to 6000 cc. The Veskanda is generally regarded as the fastest Sports Car ever designed and built in Australia. In Bowe's talented hands the Veskanda Chev easily won the 1986 Australian Sports Car Championship, with the Bowe setting outright lap records (often faster than the open wheelers) at circuits around the country. Two of these records will stand forever as the tracks are now closed: Amaroo Park in Sydney (set in 1987, track closed in 1998), and the Surfers Paradise International Raceway (set in 1986, track closed in late 1987).

Bowe and the Veskanda finished second in the three round 1987 ASCC after engine reliability troubles saw him retire from the first race at a very wet Calder Park in Melbourne. He then easily won the final two rounds at Amaroo and Sandown Park to finish nineteen points behind Andy Roberts in his self-designed Roberts SR3. Following the season the car was parked as Bowe was moving full-time into Touring Car Racing in 1988.

Van Elsen entered the Veskanda in the Sandown 360 which was a round of that year's 1988 World Sports-Prototype Championship. Bowe teamed with his Touring Car team owner and teammate Dick Johnson in the Veskanda (the 5.8 litre V8 was replaced for the meeting by a 6.0 litre Chevrolet V8). After qualifying a credible 8th with a time of 1:35.510 (compared to Jean Louis Schlesser's pole time of 1:28.620 in his Sauber C9), the pair completed 87 laps, six less than the winning Sauber C9 of Schlesser and Jochen Mass. Unlike the 1984 World Sportscar Championship race when Australian sports cars, GT and sports sedans had been permitted to compete in a special class by the FIA, Australian cars were not eligible for the 1988 event. However, although the Veskanda had been built to comply with CAMS Group A rules, it had also been built to the FIA's Group C sports car rules and was thus free to enter and race.

Ultimately the Bowe / Johnson Veskanda, the only Australian car in the 18 car field, was disqualified for using more fuel than the rules allowed.

Touring Cars
Bowe's two CAMS Gold Stars in 1984 and 1985 saw him finally get the attention of the Australian touring car establishment. In mid-1985 he was contacted by New Zealander Mark Petch to join the Mark Petch Motorsport Volvo 240 Turbo team during the 1985 Australian Endurance Championship. Bowe co-drove with the team's lead driver Robbie Francevic at the Sandown 500 and the Bathurst 1000. They were a DNF at Sandown after the differential in the Volvo locked solid underneath Bowe at the entrance to the pits on lap 60 (the car had to be pushed into the pits with the rear end supported by a trolley jack). At Bathurst the turbocharged Volvo was considered the only car capable of matching the speed of the three V12 Jaguar XJS' run by Tom Walkinshaw Racing. The Volvo qualified fifth fastest after Hardie's Heroes (set by Francevic), and after running second and third in the early laps, was destined to spend time in the pits having the alternator replaced, losing many laps. The car failed to finish after running out of fuel on lap 122. Despite it being only the second time he had driven the Volvo, and not having previously driven at the Mount Panorama Circuit, Bowe proved to be as quick in the car at Bathurst as Francevic until late in the final qualifying session when the team put on a set of qualifying tyres and Francevic set the third fastest time.

Prior to 1985, Bowe had never driven the Bathurst circuit and before practice started enlisted the services star driver Allan Grice to show him how to drive the track. Grice was only too happy to show the Bathurst rookie the fast way around the daunting circuit, something Bowe continues to be grateful for.

During the 1986 Australian Touring Car Championship the new factory-supported Volvo Dealer Team replaced the Mark Petch Motorsport outfit and expanded to a second car and Bowe joined Francevic in the team full-time at round four. Bowe proved he could match it with the likes of Francevic, Peter Brock, Dick Johnson, George Fury and Jim Richards by qualifying on pole and easily leading the 5th round of the championship at Wanneroo in Perth until the new Volvo's engine went off song and forced him to retire. Francevic went on to win the championship, with Bowe taking eighth place in the series including a pair of third places at Calder Park and also at Oran Park in Sydney. Also in 1986, Bowe raced the Veskanda-Chevrolet Sports car owned by Bernie van Elsen and used it to dominate the Australian Sports Car Championship, along the way setting outright lap records at various tracks around the country.

Bowe became the lead driver of the Volvo team after Francevic was fired from the team shortly by team boss John Sheppard after his refusal to drive a newly built car at the 1986 Castrol 500 (he was also fired for comments made to the media on race morning which Francevic claimed was aimed at the race officials, but Sheppard took as criticising the team). Once again though, the Volvo proved fragile and unable to effectively threaten for the 1986 endurance races, though Bowe was able to qualify the Volvo in fifth place for the 1986 James Hardie 1000. The team closed at the end of the season leaving Bowe without a drive for the 1987 season.

He was picked up by the Peter Jackson Nissan Racing team for the 1987 endurance season, mainly as a co-driver with young sensation Glenn Seton. The pair finished fourth at Bathurst in the Nissan Skyline RS DR30, and were later promoted to second after the disqualification of the Texaco Eggenberger Ford team. Although the Nissan's won a number of touring car races in Australia during 1986 and 1987, Bowe would later claim both privately and publicly that the turbocharged 4 cyl DR30 Skyline (which had no aerodynamic aids making it very unstable at high speed) was the worst touring car he ever raced, thoughts that were echoed by regular Nissan drivers Seton and George Fury.

Bowe's first major touring car win came in the 1987 Yokohama/Bob Jane T-Marts 300 at the Calder Park Raceway. The race was run on the rarely used combined circuit which incorporated both the 1986 redeveloped road course and the newly completed NASCAR-style "Thunderdome" oval. Bowe and Sydney driver Terry Shiel won the race, the first on the combined course, driving the Peter Jackson team's spare Nissan Skyline RS DR30 from the Holden VL Commodore SS Group A of Bowe's former open wheel rival Larry Perkins, and the Commodore's owner Bill O'Brien. As of 2016 this is believed to be the only touring car victory for a Japanese car on the high-banked Thunderdome.

For 1988, Dick Johnson Racing hired Bowe, replacing Gregg Hansford as the team's number two driver in their Ford Sierra RS500's. Team manager Neal Lowe had completely re-engineered the cars after an embarrassing 1987 endurance season and the Shell backed cars proved to be the class of the field. Bowe won his third race for the team, his first ever ATCC race win, at Winton and would go on to win again at Amaroo Park, finishing second in the 1988 ATCC behind team boss Dick Johnson. The pair salvaged a runner up position at Bathurst in the team's third entry (Bowe's ATCC Sierra) after their two primary cars failed early in the race. After Johnson and Bowe's Sierra's failed, they moved into the No. 18 car which had at that stage been driven by one of Bowe's former open wheel rivals John Smith (another open wheel rival, Alfredo Costanzo, was to be Smith's co-driver but didn't get to drive at Bathurst after Dick and John swapped cars).

After the 1988 ATCC, DJR took one Dick's championship winning Sierra to the Silverstone Circuit to contest the RAC Tourist Trophy. DJR proved they had the fastest Group A Sierra's in the world when Dick Johnson easily won the pole by just under half a second against the best European and British opposition. Johnson and Bowe led the race early on and were pulling away from the Eggenberger and Andy Rouse Sierra's, with Johnson setting the circuits Group A lap record, until the water pump in the car failed and had to be replaced. Rouse would go on to win the race, with the DJR Sierra eventually finishing 21st.

The 1989 ATCC would prove to be more of the same for Bowe, again finishing runner up to Johnson after taking victories at Amaroo Park and Wanneroo. The 1989 Tooheys 1000 at Bathurst was a triumph for Bowe and Johnson, seeing off all challengers on their way to victory, including the Eggenberger built and engineered Allan Moffat Sierra's driven by European aces Klaus Niedzwiedz and Frank Biela, as well as Peter Brock's Rouse built Sierra (with Rouse himself co-driving) which Brock had put on pole position. With the Shell Sierra limping due to failing turbo boost, Bowe drove the car over the finish line at Bathurst, saying to Channel 7 commentator Mike Raymond "Fancy doing that" over racecam as he did so.

Over the next three seasons his 1987 team Nissan, now running the formidable 4WD, twin-turbo Nissan GT-R, surged to the fore-front of Australian Touring Car racing and Bowe's only win would come at the Sandown round of the 1992 Australian Touring Car Championship. Bowe would then go on to finish second with Johnson in the now ageing Sierra at the crash shortened 1992 Tooheys 1000.

V8Supercar

DJR fortunes reversed in 1993 with the advent of the V8 based regulations that in 1997 would become known as V8 Supercar. The team's new Ford Falcon V8s returned to the front with Bowe winning the first round under the new regulations at Amaroo Park. Bowe would narrowly miss out on second place in the championship. For the 1994 season DJR was initially off the pace until the Sandown 500 where in a race of mixed fortunes Bowe and Johnson won, taking the team's first Sandown 500 win after over 15 years of disappointment. Four weeks later in one of the most dramatic Bathurst 1000s of all time Bowe and Johnson held off a pursuing pack of five Holdens late in the race to win, with Bowe memorably fighting for the lead with teenage debutante Craig Lowndes in the final laps.

The team continued their good form into 1995 where not even the destruction of tyre suppliers Dunlop factory in the Kobe earthquake could stop Bowe from winning the 1995 Australian Touring Car Championship, taking victories at Symmons Plains, a sprint round held at Bathurst for the first time since 1972, Winton and under terrific pressure from Glenn Seton and Peter Brock, the championship finale at Oran Park. The team went on to win back-to-back Sandown 500s but didn't finish at Bathurst after an accident with Glenn Seton while leading stopped their run on lap 110.

Bowe continued to race for DJR for the next three seasons, taking a second sprint victory at Bathurst in 1996, Lakeside in 1997 and Winton in 1998, the last of his 15 Touring Car round victories. Bowe also finished runner up in the 1996 Australian Touring Car Championship and Bathurst 1000 to his young rival from two years prior, Craig Lowndes.

Bowe moved on to Caterpillar backed West Australian team PAE Motorsport seeking a new challenge but before the season was out the team had been sold to Queensland car dealer John Briggs. Despite some early promise he was fired from the team after Bathurst in 2001 with just a single race win at Queensland Raceway in 1999 to show for his efforts.

From 2002 to 2006 Bowe and new team-mate Brad Jones had mixed fortunes. As with Briggs Motorsport early promise faded as the team struggled to find the resources to regularly threaten the front running teams. Always a threat at Bathurst, Bowe and Jones finished third in 2004 and won the second race in the 2005 Australian Grand Prix non-championship event.

Retirement
Announcing his retirement, Bowe raced a final season in 2007 for Paul Cruickshank Racing. In March 2007 Bowe broke the record for most championship races starts when he started in round 2 at Barbagallo, his 213th start. His race was marred with two spins. His prospects for a glorious final season appear limited as PCR was a single car team and under funded compared to the front running teams. In 2008 Bowe returned to Sports car racing in a Lamborghini Gallardo in the Australian GT Championship, before securing a full-time drive in 2009 with the Touring Car Masters series for historic touring cars, driving a Chevrolet Camaro. 2010 saw John Bowe returning to the Touring Car Masters category driving "Sally", his 1969 Ford Mustang (powered by a Ford 351 Windsor V8 engine), with sponsorship from WesTrac and Wilson Security. Bowe also runs the number 18 on his Mustang, the same number he used when driving for Dick Johnson Racing.

Bowe's name has been lent to the John Bowe Trophy, awarded to the winner of the Formula 3 Tasmanian Super Prix.

Driving a Ferrari 458 GT3 for Maranello Motorsport alongside Craig Lowndes, Peter Edwards, and former Formula One driver Mika Salo, Bowe was the winner of the 2014 Bathurst 12 Hour on 9 February. It was his third success in the race after winning at Eastern Creek in 1995 and at Bathurst in 2010.

Career results

Complete Australian Touring Car Championship results
(key) (Races in bold indicate pole position) (Races in italics indicate fastest lap)

Complete World Touring Car Championship results
(key) (Races in bold indicate pole position) (Races in italics indicate fastest lap)

† Not registered for series & points

Complete World Sports Prototype Championship results
(key) (Races in bold indicate pole position) (Races in italics indicate fastest lap)

Complete European Touring Car Championship results
(key) (Races in bold indicate pole position) (Races in italics indicate fastest lap)

Complete Asia-Pacific Touring Car Championship results
(key) (Races in bold indicate pole position) (Races in italics indicate fastest lap)

Complete Bathurst 1000 results

Complete Sandown 500 results

Complete Bathurst/Eastern Creek 12 Hour results

Notes
 – The 1995 race was staged at Eastern Creek Raceway as the 1995 Eastern Creek 12 Hour. All other races were held at the Mount Panorama Circuit.

Complete Bathurst 24 Hour results

References

 Official John Bowe Web Site – 
 V8 Supercar Bio – 
 Conrod – 

1954 births
Australian Formula 2 drivers
Australian Touring Car Championship drivers
Bathurst 1000 winners
Living people
Members of the Order of Australia
People from Devonport, Tasmania
Racing drivers from Tasmania
Supercars Championship drivers
World Sportscar Championship drivers
Australian Endurance Championship drivers
Dick Johnson Racing drivers